In alchemy, the term chrysopoeia (from Greek , , "gold-making") refers to the artificial production of gold, most commonly by the alleged transmutation of base metals such as lead. A related term is argyropoeia ("silver-making"), referring to the artificial production of silver, often by transmuting copper. Although alchemists pursued many different goals, the making of gold and silver remained one of the defining ambitions of alchemy throughout its history, from Zosimus of Panopolis (c. 300) to Robert Boyle (1627–1691).

The word was used in the title of a brief alchemical work, the Chrysopoeia of Cleopatra attributed to Cleopatra the Alchemist, which was probably written in the first centuries of the Christian era, but which is first found on a single leaf in a tenth-to-eleventh century manuscript in the Biblioteca Marciana, Venice, MS Marciana gr. Z. 299. The document features an ouroboros containing the words "the all is one", a concept that is related to Hermeticism. Stephen of Alexandria wrote a work called De Chrysopoeia.   Chrysopoeia is also the title of a 1515 poem by Giovanni Augurello.

Other images from the Chrysopoeia of Cleopatra

See also
 Magnum opus
 Philosophers' stone
 Synthesis of precious metals
 Nuclear transmutation

References

Works Cited

 
 
 

Alchemical concepts
Gold
Silver